Lesnoy is a rural locality (a settlement) in Barnaul, Altai Krai, Russia. The population was 1,639 as of 2013. There are 53 streets.

References 

Rural localities in Barnaul urban okrug